Asclepias involucrata, common name dwarf milkweed, is a plant found in the American southwest.

Uses
The Zuni people mix the dry powdered root with saliva and use it for an unspecified illness.  The Zuni also note that this plant is favored by jackrabbits.

References

involucrata
Flora of the Southwestern United States
Plants used in traditional Native American medicine